Sevilla Fútbol Club, commonly known as Sevilla, is a professional football club based in Seville, Spain. The club first participated in a European competition in 1957, entering the European Cup, and have competed in twenty nine seasons of European competitions since then. They have won a record six UEFA Cup/Europa League titles.

Overall record

Statistics in UEFA competitions 
The debut of Sevilla in European competitions took place in the 1957–58 season as a participant of that season's European Cup. Despite finishing runner-up in the league to Real Madrid, Sevilla represented Spain in the competition as Real had already qualified by winning the European Cup the season before.

Accurate as of 16 March 2023

Pld = Matches played; W = Won; D = Drawn; L = Lost; GF = Goals for; GA = Goals against; GD = Goal difference

Results

European Cup / UEFA Champions League

UEFA Cup / UEFA Europa League

UEFA Super Cup

European Cup Winners' Cup

Inter-Cities Fairs Cup (Non-UEFA Competition)

Supercopa Euroamericana (Friendly UEFA-CONMEBOL)

References

External links 
 Official websites
  
 Sevilla FC at La Liga 
 Sevilla FC at UEFA 

European football
Spanish football clubs in international competitions